Peter Barker (born 16 January 1936) is  a former Australian rules footballer who played with Footscray in the Victorian Football League (VFL).

Notes

External links 
		

Living people
1936 births
Australian rules footballers from Victoria (Australia)
Western Bulldogs players
Kyneton Football Club players